"Systemagic" is a song performed by English group Goldfrapp, taken from their seventh studio album Silver Eye (2017). It was released as the album's second single on 12 May 2017 by Mute Records. The song was written and produced by Alison Goldfrapp and William Owen Gregory, with additional production coming from John Congleton.

Music video 
A music video was released on 24 April 2017.

Track listing 
"Systemagic" / "Anymore" (Remixes Pt. 1) digital download
 "Systemagic" (Hannah Holland Remix) – 7:34
 "Anymore" (Ralphi Rosario Tek Vocal Mix) – 7:01

"Systemagic" / "Anymore" (Remixes Pt. 2) digital download
 "Systemagic" (Ralphi Rosario Lunar Eclipse Mix) – 6:58
 "Anymore" (Whatever/Whatever Remix by Justin Strauss & Bryan Mette) – 7:54

UK promo CD
 "Systemagic" (Radio Edit 1) – 3:33

UK promo CD
 "Systemagic" (Radio Edit 2) – 3:38

References

External links 
 

2017 singles
2017 songs
Goldfrapp songs
Songs written by Alison Goldfrapp
Songs written by Will Gregory
Mute Records singles
Song recordings produced by John Congleton